Iboga alkaloids are alkaloid constituents of Tabernanthe iboga. Iboga alkaloids include ibogaine, tabernanthine, coronaridine, voacangine, ibogamine, and harmaline, among others. Noribogaine is a major active metabolite of ibogaine, and 18-methoxycoronaridine is a synthetic derivative of coronaridine.

References